Bijnor Lok Sabha Constituency is one of the 80 Lok Sabha (parliamentary) constituencies in Uttar Pradesh state in northern India

Vidhan Sabha segments

Members of Lok Sabha

^ by poll

Election results

General Election 2019

General Election 2014

Lok Sabha Election 1984
 Girdhar Lal (Congress)
 Mangal Ram Premi (Lok Dal)

By Election 1985
 Meira Kumar  (Congress) : 1,28,086 votes
 Ram Vilas Paswan (Lok Dal (Charan)) : 1,22,747
 Mayawati (Bahujan Samaj Party) :  61,504

Lok Sabha Election 1977
 Mahi Lal (Janata Party) : 258,663 votes   
 Ram Dayal (Congress) : 62,849

See also
 Bijnor district
 List of Constituencies of the Lok Sabha

Notes

External links
Bijnor lok sabha  constituency election 2019 result details
Bijnor lok sabha  constituency election 2019 date and schedule

Lok Sabha constituencies in Uttar Pradesh
Politics of Bijnor district